Pádraig O'Sullivan (born 11 May 1984) is an Irish Fianna Fáil politician who has been a Teachta Dála (TD) for the Cork North-Central constituency since the 2019 by-election. 

He was a member of Cork County Council for the Cobh local electoral area from 2014 to 2019. Before he joined Fianna Fail in July 2012, he ran as an independent as part of the New Vision alliance at the 2011 general election. Sheila O'Callaghan was co-opted to O'Sullivan's seat on Cork County Council following his election to the Dáil.

At the general election in February 2020, O'Sullivan was re-elected in his Cork North-Central constituency.

A teacher by profession, O'Sullivan teaches Irish and history at Coláiste an Chraoibhín. He lives in Glanmire with his wife, Bernie, and their three children.

References

External links
Pádraig O'Sullivan's page on the Fianna Fáil website

 

1984 births
Living people
Politicians from County Cork
Fianna Fáil TDs
Members of the 32nd Dáil
Members of the 33rd Dáil
Local councillors in County Cork